Robert Lee Fulghum (born June 4, 1937) is an American author and Unitarian Universalist minister.

Early career
He grew up in Waco, Texas and received his Bachelor of Arts at Baylor University in 1958. He received his Bachelor of Divinity at Starr King School for the Ministry in 1961 and was ordained as a Unitarian Universalist minister. Fulghum served the Bellingham Unitarian Fellowship in Bellingham, Washington from 1960–1964, and the Edmonds Unitarian Universalist Church in Edmonds, Washington where he is Minister Emeritus.

Writing
Fulghum came to prominence in the United States when his first collection of writings, All I Really Need to Know I Learned in Kindergarten (1988), stayed on The New York Times bestseller lists for nearly two years. The collection of essays is subtitled "Uncommon Thoughts on Common Things." A twenty-fifth anniversary edition of Kindergarten has been published – updating and revising the original text, with the addition of twenty-five new stories.

There are currently more than 17 million copies of his books in print, published in 27 languages in 103 countries.

Performances
Fulghum performed in two television adaptations of his work for PBS, and is a Grammy nominee for the spoken word award. He has been a speaker at numerous colleges, conventions, and public events across the United States and Europe. He has been a nationally syndicated newspaper columnist.

Novels
Fulghum wrote a novel in three volumes. The first, Third Wish, was continued in Third Wish II, The Rest of the Story, Almost, and completed with the third volume, Third Wish, Granted. The novel was published in several languages, including English.

His next novel, If You Love Me Still, Will You Love Me Moving? Tales from the Century Ballroom, was inspired by Fulghum's love of dancing, especially tango, and was first published in Czech (as Drž mě pevně, miluj mě zlehka) in 2011.

Eventually, his books of essays were transformed into two stage productions. The first shares the same title as his first book, and was conceived and adapted by Ernest Zulia, with music and lyrics by David Caldwell. The play is based on all eight books, and is an optional musical. The second is entitled Uh-Oh, Here Comes Christmas. To date there have been more than 2,000 national and international productions of these plays.

Personal life
Fulghum has four children and six grandchildren. He lives in Moab, Utah and on the Greek island of Crete.

Works
His collections include:
 All I Really Need to Know I Learned in Kindergarten
 It Was on Fire When I Lay Down on It
 Uh-Oh: Some Observations from Both Sides of the Refrigerator Door
 Maybe (Maybe Not)
 From Beginning to End—The Rituals of Our Lives
 True Love
 Words I Wish I Wrote
 What on Earth Have I Done
 The Ongoing Adventures of Captain Kindergarten
 If  You Love Me Still, Will You Love Me Moving?
 The Argentine Tango Chronicles
 Crisis In The Cheese Aisle (in Czech only)
 The Mender of Destinies (in Czech only)

References

External links

 

1937 births
21st-century American novelists
American male novelists
American Unitarian Universalists
American Unitarian clergy
Living people
Writers from Bellingham, Washington
People from Edmonds, Washington
People from Waco, Texas
Rock Bottom Remainders members
Unitarian Universalist clergy
Writers from Seattle
American male essayists
21st-century American essayists
21st-century American male writers
Novelists from Washington (state)